HMNZS Endeavour may refer to one of the following ships of the Royal New Zealand Navy named in honour of Captain Cook's Bark Endeavour.

 , served as the Antarctic support vessel from 1956 to 1962
 , served as the Antarctic support vessel from 1962 to 1971
 , the fleet tanker from 1988 to 2017

See also
 Endeavour (disambiguation)

Royal New Zealand Navy ship names